Anyword is a technology company that offers an artificial intelligence platform, using natural language processing to generate and optimize marketing text for websites, social media, email, and ads. The company also offers a complete managed service to publishers and brands to help them increase their revenue through social ads. It is used by National Geographic, Red Bull, The New York Times, BBC, Ted Baker, etc. The company has an office in New York,  and Tel Aviv.

History 
The company was founded in 2013 — its original name was Keywee Inc.

In 2021, the company rebranded to Anyword and launched its AI copywriting platform. It's often called the world first language optimization platform.

In 2019, Anyword established the first generation of its language model.

In 2020, the first part of ad copy was generated using Anyword's AI.

Reviews report that Anyword's platform works with different marketing projects in 25 languages  while the AI settings panel provides many options for promoting content.

In March 2015, Anyword received $9.1 million in the Series A funding round led by a notable group of investors.

In July 2016, the company was selected as an official Facebook Marketing Partner.

In August 2019, Anyword was named Best Content Marketing Platform in the Digiday Technology Award winners.

In November 2021, it raised $21 million in its Series B funding round.

In February 2022, Anyword received the High Performer Winter 2022 Award. 

In summer 2022, the company was announced as a leader in the AI Writing Assistant category of G2. 

AI writing assistants are tools that use artificial intelligence (AI), natural language processing (NLP) and machine learning (ML) to generate AI-powered content based on the inputs a user gives them. 

What is an AI writing assistant? 

An AI-powered writing assistant is any software that's designed to automate the process of content creation for marketing, communication or educational purposes. Some examples of writing assistants are Grammarly, Jasper.ai, Anyword and hundreds out there on the internet.

Product 
Anyword's AI platform generates and optimized marketing copy for ads, landing pages, product listings, social posts, emails and SMS.

Anyword's Technology: Anyword's AI copywriting platform uses a combination of pre-trained and fine-tuned models, including GPT3, T5 and CTRL, to generate quality marketing copy for its customers.

The platform's proprietary Predictive Performance Score gives use a sense of how a singular piece of copy will perform for any given audience.

The platform also lets users pick specific demographic filters or copywriting formulas to further fine-tune their copy. Power Mode is also available on the platform and lets customers upload a piece of text in their own tone and style, so that the AI can then generate variations that match.

References 

Applications of artificial intelligence